Chiranjib Jha  (born 14 January 1915) was an Indian politician. He was a Member of Parliament, representing Saharsa, Bihar in the Lok Sabha the lower house of India's Parliament as a member of the Indian National Congress.

References

External links
Official biographical sketch in Parliament of India website

1915 births
Possibly living people
India MPs 1971–1977
Lok Sabha members from Bihar
Indian National Congress politicians
Indian National Congress politicians from Bihar